Josue Espada (born August 30, 1975) is a Puerto Rican professional baseball coach and former minor league player who is the current bench coach of the Houston Astros of Major League Baseball (MLB).
He was born in San Juan, Puerto Rico.

Espada was the third base coach for the Miami Marlins. He then joined the New York Yankees as a special assistant to General Manager Brian Cashman in 2014. Prior to the 2015 season, Espada was named the Yankees' third base coach. The Astros hired Espada after the 2017 season.

Playing career
Espada attended the University of Mobile, where he played college baseball for the Mobile Rams. He set a Mobile record with a .442 batting average. The Oakland Athletics selected Espada in the second round, with the 45th overall selection, of the 1996 Major League Baseball draft.

The Minnesota Twins selected Espada from the Athletics in the 1998 Rule 5 draft, but he failed to make the Twins' Opening Day roster and was returned to the Athletics. Espada played in Oakland's system through the 2000 season.

A free agent in 2001, Espada signed with the Florida Marlins, and was traded to the Colorado Rockies for Juan Acevedo in August 2001. He later played for the Kansas City Royals, St. Louis Cardinals, Texas Rangers, and Tampa Bay Devil Rays organizations. In 2004, Espada played for the Pensacola Pelicans in the Central Baseball League, an independent baseball league. He retired after the 2005 season, reaching Triple-A, but never playing in the majors.

Coaching career
After retiring, Espada became a coach in the Marlins' organization. He served as the hitting coach of the Greensboro Grasshoppers of the Class A South Atlantic League in 2006 and for the Jupiter Hammerheads of the Class A-Advanced Florida State League in 2007. Espada spent the next two seasons as the Marlins' minor league infield coordinator.

The Marlins named Espada as their third base coach prior to the 2010 season. He also coached for the Puerto Rican national baseball team during the 2013 World Baseball Classic. Espada served as the Marlins' third base coach through the 2013 season. After the season, he was reassigned to manage Jupiter, as the Marlins wanted Espada to gain managerial experience. Instead, Espada took a job with the New York Yankees as a special assistant to General Manager Brian Cashman.

On January 11, 2015, the Yankees hired Espada to be the team's new infield coach and third base coach. He manages the Gigantes de Carolina of the Liga de Béisbol Profesional Roberto Clemente in winter baseball. Espada again coached the Puerto Rican team in the 2017 World Baseball Classic.

The Houston Astros hired Espada after the 2017 season to become their bench coach. He interviewed for the Texas Rangers' managerial position after the 2018 season and for the Chicago Cubs' managerial position after the 2019 season.

In 2022, the Astros won 106 games, the second-highest total in franchise history.  They advanced to the World Series and defeated the Philadelphia Phillies in six games to give Espada his first career World Series title.

Personal life
Espada is married to Pamela Dearth, the sister of Brandon Hyde's wife. The Espadas live in Fulshear, Texas, with their two daughters.

References

External links

MLB.com biography

1975 births
Living people
Baseball infielders
Calgary Cannons players
Colorado Springs Sky Sox players
Frisco RoughRiders players
Houston Astros coaches
Huntsville Stars players
Major League Baseball bench coaches
Major League Baseball third base coaches
Memphis Redbirds players
Miami Marlins coaches
Midland RockHounds players
Minor league baseball coaches
Mobile Rams baseball players
Montgomery Biscuits players
New York Yankees coaches
New York Yankees executives
Omaha Royals players
Palm Beach Cardinals players
Pensacola Pelicans players
Puerto Rican expatriate baseball players in Canada
Sacramento River Cats players
Southern Oregon Timberjacks players
Vancouver Canadians players
Visalia Oaks players
West Michigan Whitecaps players
Mat-Su Miners players